Dotsugobius bleekeri, also known as the dark mangrovegoby, is a species of fish in the family Gobiidae known from brackish estuarine and the adjacent freshwater areas of the eastern Indian Ocean, Andaman Sea and Western Pacific. The generic name honours the Japanese ichthyologist Yoshie Dotsu, whose surname was spelled “Dôtu” in his earlier publications, of Nagasaki University while the specific name honours the Dutch ichthyologist, herpetologist and physician Pieter Bleeker (1819-1878) who was a significant worker on the fish fauna of the Dutch East Indies. This species is placed in the genus Lophogobius by some authorities.

References

Fish of the Indian Ocean
Fish of the Pacific Ocean
Taxa named by Canna Maria Louise Popta
Gobiidae
Monotypic fish genera